Loubna Mrie (Arabic: لبنى مرعي ; born 1991) is a Syrian civil rights activist.

Life 

Mrie comes from an Alawite family from a village near Latakia. Her father is a high official in the Syrian Air Force Intelligence. Despite her family ties, she is one of a few Alawites to join the fight against the Assad regime and has been branded a traitor by her father.

As rioting broke out in the initial stages of the Syrian Civil War, Loubna attended Latakia University but moved to Damascus in 2012 as Latakia was deemed to be unsafe for activists. This was due to Assad troops opening fire on civilian protestors. She later joined the Free Syrian Army (FSA) where she helped with the transport of food and medical aid, then with the smuggling of ammunition. She promoted the aims of the revolution in the Alawitian community and spoke with the victims of government-run troops. After her father issued a warrant for her arrest, she fled in August 2012 to Turkey.

On August 11, 2012, her mother was abducted, according to her father, who subsequently broke off all contact with her. Loubna later received information from a friend about the death of her mother.

She later became a photojournalist with Reuters based in Aleppo where she covered the conflict then moved to New York where she is a researcher and commentator on Syrian and Middle Eastern affairs. She has been published in The Washington Post, Rosa-Luxemburg-Stiftung, and The New Republic, among other publications.

References

Civil rights activists
1991 births
Living people
Syrian activists
Syrian women activists
People from Latakia Governorate
Free Syrian Army
Members of the Free Syrian Army